Ras El Oued District is a district in Bordj Bou Arréridj Province, Algeria.

Municipalities
The district is further divided into 3 municipalities:
Ras El Oued
Aïn Tesra 
Ouled Brahem

Districts of Bordj Bou Arréridj Province